Serrapetrona is a comune (municipality) in the province of Macerata in the Italian region Marche, located about  southwest of Ancona and about  southwest of Macerata.

Serrapetrona borders the following municipalities: Belforte del Chienti, Caldarola, Camerino, Castelraimondo, San Severino Marche, Tolentino.

The church of Santa Maria is located in the square Piazza Santa Maria.

References

Cities and towns in the Marche